Denuwan Rajakaruna (born 30 September 1990) is a Sri Lankan first-class cricketer who plays for Moors Sports Club.

References

External links
 

1990 births
Living people
Sri Lankan cricketers
Moors Sports Club cricketers
Nugegoda Sports and Welfare Club cricketers
Sportspeople from Galle
Hambantota Troopers cricketers